Monzo Bank Ltd is an online bank based in the United Kingdom. Monzo was one of the earliest of a number of new app-based challenger banks in the UK.

Originally operating through a mobile app and a prepaid debit card, in April 2017 its UK banking licence restrictions were lifted, enabling it to offer a full current account. As of July 2022, Monzo had over 5.8 million customers. Their most recent financial results issued in July 2022, showed an annual net loss of £119M (an increase from the £116.2M lost in the previous year) on revenue of £154.2M.

History
Monzo Bank was founded as Mondo in 2015 by Tom Blomfield, Jonas Huckestein, Jason Bates, Paul Rippon and Gary Dolman. The team originally met whilst working at Starling Bank. In February 2016, Monzo set the record for "quickest crowd-funding campaign in history" when it raised £1m in 96 seconds via the Crowdcube investment platform.

Two weeks prior to the name change, Monzo was granted a restricted banking licence, by the Prudential Regulation Authority and the Financial Conduct Authority and in April 2017 these restrictions were lifted. Monzo had a number of prepaid debit cards in operation which it issued to users for testing purposes. These cards were in use until current accounts were made available to all and the prepaid programme was closed on 4 April 2018.

On 16 May 2017, Monzo announced that over £250 million had been spent through its prepaid card, between 200,000 customers.

Monzo initially traded as Mondo. On 13 June 2016, a company blog post announced that the "Mondo" trademark had been legally challenged by an undisclosed company with a similar name. As a result, a naming suggestion contest was organised and the new name, "Monzo", was registered at Companies House under the legal name "Monzo Bank Ltd" in August 2016.

On 17 July 2017, Monzo announced the current account preview and began inviting eligible customers to sign-up for a preview of the full current account. Initially, customers attended events at the company's offices in London but cards were also sent out via post. In line with the company's general stance on transparency, the Monzo website included a live counter showing progress on the rollout.

In October 2017, Monzo announced that it would be discontinuing free ATM withdrawals abroad, replacing them with a free monthly withdrawal of up to £200 and a charge of 3% on subsequent withdrawals. This change came into effect on 18 December 2017.

On 7 June 2018 Monzo announced an integration with IFTTT which allowed users to connect their account to smart devices and services. For example, connecting Monzo to Amazon Alexa.

On 25 June 2018, Monzo announced their team up with TransferWise to provide international money transfers from within their Monzo app. Existing TransferWise customer can connect their account to use along Monzo app. It was later announced in November 2018 that interest would be paid on savings (in 'Savings Pots' above £1,000) in collaboration with Investec.

In October 2018, Monzo reached one million customers, and was also named the best tech startup to work for by LinkedIn UK.

On 21 November 2018, Monzo added the functionality for users to pay cash into their Monzo accounts using PayPoint, charging users £1 for each deposit.

On 28 January 2019, Monzo announced a partnership with Flux to add itemised receipts and loyalty points. In addition to this, the API to create receipts was published by Monzo.

In August 2019, the company announced that it had inadvertently logged 480,000 customer personal identification numbers, making them accessible to Monzo's internal team of engineers. The issue arose because PINs were transmitted in the query string of a HTTPS request. That month the company also launched its loan products for customers.

In March 2020, Monzo announced the creation of two business bank accounts for sole traders and small to medium sized businesses. In May, Blomfield announced that he was moving from CEO to president of the company and TS Anil would become the company's CEO.

In July 2020, Monzo launched its new premium subscription service, Monzo Plus. Within the first month, the premium account had gained over 50,000 active users.

In October 2020, Monzo launched its new top tier subscription service, Monzo Premium.

In February 2021, Monzo announced Carol Nelson as the new US CEO, taking over from TS Anil who became Monzo's global CEO after temporarily holding both titles.

In September 2021, Monzo launched Flex, a buy-now-pay-later product. Later in the year, they announced a virtual credit card that can be used to make Flex transactions directly.

In October 2021, Monzo announced that it had withdrawn its application for a US banking licence. Carol Nelson stepped down as US CEO following the annoucement.

Monzo US exited beta and was fully launched on 1 February 2022.

Fundraising 
In October 2016, Monzo announced an 'interim' funding round valuing the company at £50M and raised £4.8M in the process led by Passion Capital. This round was followed by a second £2.5 million Crowdcube crowd-funding campaign with the total pledged quickly hitting the target amount.

In February 2017, Monzo raised £19.5M from Thrive Capital, Passion Capital, and Orange Digital Ventures, which it intended to supplement with a crowdfunding campaign for an additional £2.5 million.

On 6 November 2017, Monzo raised £71 million from several investors in a round led by Goodwater Capital. At the close of the round, Monzo was valued at £280 million.

On 30 October 2018, Monzo became a pound “unicorn,” with an £85 million fundraising round valuing the company at £1 billion.

On 5 December 2018, Monzo held another £20 million Crowdcube crowdfunding campaign, reaching nearly £18 million in funding in less than three hours, and reaching the £20 million goal in just over two days.

On 24 June 2019, Monzo raised £113 million in a Series F funding round led by Y Combinator's Continuity fund. This round gave Monzo a valuation of £2 billion.

Their valuation fell 40% in 2020, raising a £60M down round in June, valuing the firm at £1.24B. In December 2020, Monzo closed another £60M funding. Among the investors were some well known firms such as for Novator, Kaiser, TED Global.

In December 2021, Monzo closed a $600m funding round at a valuation of $4.5bn.

U.S. expansion 
Monzo announced on 13 June 2019 that it would begin offering services in the United States, though it provided no timetable for an actual launch. During its announcement to expand, the company said that it would distribute about 2,000 debit cards to prospective members who attended events held by the company in major U.S. cities like Los Angeles, San Francisco and New York City. Along with retrieval of the debit cards, attendees were expected to offer the company feedback on their products and services.

The company faces a more onerous regulatory environment in the US than in the UK. Financial technology is nationally regulated in the UK, and British regulators have a reputation of being friendly to such companies. By contrast, technology regulation in the financial sector is handled at state level in the US, with one consultant telling CNN that "US regulators are not that savvy as far as financial services are concerned. They've either been oblivious on regulation, or incredibly strict."

Monzo will enter the US market through a partnership with Ohio-based Sutton Bank, and will retain many of its features, like instant spending notifications and contactless pay. Unlike in the UK, the company reportedly didn't intend to offer a money lending service to its US customers. The company faces a highly competitive and heavily fragmented landscape in the US, with players ranging from tech companies such as PayPal and SoFi to a multitude of traditional banks that are heavily investing in digital platforms.

Issued cards 

Monzo initially issued (with partner company Wirecard) a variety of alpha, beta and investor cards to its customers who wanted to be early adopters. These were prepaid Mastercards which the user could top-up via bank transfer or via an existing debit card. The balance on the card could then be spent via contactless, chip and pin, magnetic stripe or online. From early on, Monzo has issued cards in a neon "hot coral" colour - initially intended as a temporary measure during prototyping - but later, a deliberate decision arising from the success of the "eye-catching" design.

In December 2017, Monzo issued new Debit Mastercard cards to all its existing and new customers as the bank began rolling out current accounts. Customers signing up for the current account are issued a Debit Mastercard.

In October 2020, Monzo issued UK's first World Elite Debit Mastercard to Monzo Premium customers, Monzo said the card is made from a single 16g sheet of steel, weighs 3x more than a traditional plastic card, complete with a precision-engraved logo and a white finish. All Monzo Premium metal cards are manufactured in New Jersey, USA.

Mobile apps 

Monzo has released mobile apps for both iOS and Android phones. Payments made with the Monzo cards will trigger push notifications in real-time to phones running the apps, where historical transactions can also be viewed. Users can categorise their transactions, freeze the card (if lost), mark company expenses and view an overview of their spending habits.

Where available, the apps will show a map depicting the location at which the transaction took place, along with the company's logo. Transactions will be auto-categorised based on the company involved in the payment, with data accuracy improved via crowd-sourced suggestions.

On 29 September 2016, Monzo made the Android app publicly available for anyone in the UK to use. This was preceded by a private beta in October 2015 with consumers who visited the office in-person to collect a card.

Developer tools 

Banks in the UK currently offer customers limited or no programmatic access to their financial data. Whilst the UK Government is looking into legislation to require existing banks to comply with and adopt standards for secure and open APIs, Monzo has already released a prototype API based on the OAuth standard within a year of the company's founding.

The company has also hosted four hackathons and previously maintained a "Monzo Developers" Slack channel for developer discussion and support. The API allows developers to view transactions and accounts, receive notifications for events via webhooks and create their own items to appear in the app. The responses are encoded using JSON which allows for data access in any programming language with JSON support.

Fraud detection 

During June 2018, Monzo gained significant public interest after fraud analysts with the bank spotted signs of and publicly announced a Ticketmaster data breach in April 2018, before Ticketmaster had spotted the breach themselves, and two months before Ticketmaster admitted the breach had occurred.

In 2019 the BBC's Watchdog programme investigated Monzo after receiving complaints from Monzo customers who had their accounts frozen or closed. Affected customers complained about the length of time they were unable to access their money.
In a response to this investigation, the company said that account closures take place if the bank "suspect[s] there's financial crime".

References

Financial services companies of the United Kingdom
Banks of the United Kingdom
Online banks
Banks established in 2015
Internet properties established in 2015
Financial technology companies
Mobile payments
Online payments
Payment systems
Payment service providers
Banks based in the City of London